
Gmina Koszęcin is a rural gmina (administrative district) in Lubliniec County, Silesian Voivodeship, in southern Poland.

The gmina contains part of the protected area called Upper Liswarta Forests Landscape Park.

Villages
Gmina Koszęcin contains the villages and settlements of Brusiek, Bukowiec, Cieszowa, Dolnik, Irki, Koszęcin, Krywałd, Łazy, Lipowiec, Nowy Dwór, Piłka, Prądy, Rusinowice, Rzyce, Sadów, Strzebiń and Wierzbie.

Neighbouring gminas
Gmina Koszęcin is bordered by the towns of Kalety and Lubliniec, and by the gminas of Boronów, Herby, Kochanowice, Tworóg and Woźniki.

Twin towns – sister cities

Gmina Koszęcin is twinned with:
 Gura Humorului, Romania
 Kraubath an der Mur, Austria

References

Koszecin
Lubliniec County